Berberism or Amazighism is a Berber political-cultural movement of ethnic, geographic, or cultural nationalism, started mainly in Kabylia (Algeria) and in Morocco, later spreading to the rest of the Berber communities in the Maghreb region of North Africa. A Berber group, the Tuaregs, have been in rebellion against Mali since 2012, and established a temporarily de facto independent state called Azawad, which identified itself as Berber.

The Berberist movement in Algeria and Morocco is in opposition to cultural Arabization and the pan-Arabist political ideology. In Azawad (northern Mali), the Tuareg-Berberist movement is also secularist and is in opposition to both Arabism and perceived discrimination against nomadic Tuaregs by other Malian groups and the government.

Amazigh World Congress
The Amazigh World Congress (CMA, Congrès Mondial Amazigh; Agraw Amaḍlan Amaziɣ) is an international non-governmental organization which was begun with the purpose of providing a structure and international representation for cultural and political Berber interests. It was formed in September 1995 in Saint-Rome-de-Dolan, France. It has since held four meetings at irregular intervals, in 1997, 1999, 2002 and 2005 .

Algeria

Berberism works for the recognition of the distinct Berber identity in Algeria. Political parties and movements usually considered Berberist include:

Socialist Forces Front (Front des forces socialistes, FFS)
Rally for Culture and Democracy (Rassemblement pour la culture et la démocratie, RCD)
Movement for the Autonomy of Kabylie (Mouvement pour l'autonomie de la Kabylie, MAK)
Arouch (Mouvement citoyen des Aârchs), a movement that is also organised among Kabyles.

MAK exalts a unique Kabyle identity instead of a universal Berber one, thus also known as Kabylist.

A major movement within the Algerian Berber movement is Anti-Arabism.

Historical and modern construction of ethnic divides 
The divide between Berber and Arab Algeria was solidified by the 123-year French colonization. The Berbers were elevated above the Arabs through the narrative that Berber ancestral heritage stemmed from Europe. Consequently, Arabs and Arab speakers were associated with backwardness, which the Berbers profited from, as it granted them a higher status.

During the period of French colonization, Arabic and Berber were declared foreign languages in Algeria with the aim to restructure Algerian identity into a more Western one. This was done in attempts to assert French dominance. The Berbers were targeted with heavy French schooling, placing them at the centre of this transformation. The strongest hold France had to advance this platform was the Berber region of Kabyle, where they espoused the Kabyle Myth.

More recently, Berbers were alienated from the Algerian government following the Algerian War. Despite French attempts at a Divide and Rule strategy in Algeria, Berbers were on the forefront of the Independence movement with several key leaders of FLN (National Liberation Front), including Hocine Aït Ahmed, Abane Ramdane, and Krim Belkacem. Furthermore, Aurès and Kabylia were amongst the principal footholds of FLN due to their geographical remoteness and widespread local support for independence. In fact, the Soummam conference, often cited as the founding act of the Algerian state, took place in Kabylia. Due to Berber regions serving as hotbeds for FLN guerillas, these regions were labelled major targets in French counter-insurgency operations. These counter-insurgency operations resulted in the devastation of agricultural lands, looting, destruction of villages, population displacement, the creation of forbidden zones, etc.

Following Algerian Independence, Kabyle leaders opposed the central leadership over Arabist policies and the single-party system. These Kabyle leaders held popular backing in Kabylia and Algiers. Two years of armed conflict in Kabylia followed, leaving more than 400 dead and most FLN leaders from Kabylia exiled or executed.
These events created a sense of betrayal, which has made many Berbers suspicious of the government. An example would be Lounès Matoub's death. Lounès Matoub was a Berber secularist and activist who was murdered by Islamic extremists. Many Berbers believed he was killed by the government, chanting "Pouvoir, Assasins" (Government, Murderers) at his funeral.

Currently, the construction of the opposing ideologies is argued to be political and social in nature rather than ethnic. The dynamics were shifted when the Berber movement entered to make demands in the political sphere. Many of these demands arose from the region of Kabyle in Algeria. Kabylian Berbers constitute two-thirds of the Berber population and have been the strongest advocates for the Berber movement. The second-largest group are the Chaoui Berbers who reside in the Aures mountains. While the elite sphere consisted of the Kabyle population, the Chaoui played an important role due to their military influence. On the whole, the Berberophones make up roughly 25% of the Algerian population, constituting seven to eight million people. In 2002, Tamazight was declared a national language in Algeria alongside Arabic to accommodate this large percentage of the population.

1940 to 1950 Berberist crisis 
The developments of 1940 to 1950 constituted a period of social unrest in Algerian politics which would set the framework for the coming years. The emergence of the Algerian Arabism-Islamism Nationalist framework meant to combat colonialism was accompanied by the emergence of Berberism, to combat this Arabism-Islamism. The Berbers demanded for the redefinition of the society they were historically a part of (linguistically and culturally): they wanted an 'Algerian Algeria' to represent all the ethnic and cultural minorities of the nation. The Movement for the Triumph of Democratic Liberties (MTLD) continued to impose the Arabism-Islamism framework and were denounced as anti-democratic by Berber activists.

The MTLD refused to acknowledge these minorities because it would have hindered their advancement in the provincial elections. This led to the beginning of open conflict between Berber partisans and "Arab unity" advocates: the outbreak of the Berber crisis. At this stage, the Algerian People's Party (PPA) and MTLD, both headquartered in Paris, had merged to advance the Berber platform. They wanted to replace the single-party state system with democracy. This 'Algerian Algeria' would include the contributions, histories and cultures of all the ethnic populations. The platform as stated by Rachid Ali revolved around the fact that the Berbers should break the status quo that they have no place in society, as Algeria does not belong to the Arab world but was instead a nation for all its citizens. With the adoption of this platform, the Berber activists were seen as a threat to unity and independence by the Arabists-Islamists, on the account that "the Berbers wished to impose the Western agenda on Algeria".

Effects of 1962 constitution and Arabization 
The 1962 Constitution declared that Islam was the state religion and Arabic was the national language. These two aspects of identity became mutually exclusive to be Algerian. In turn, linguistic and cultural diversity was interpreted as a threat to national unity. Rapid Arabization measures were implemented after independence in 1962 which sought to spread the Arabic language throughout the country. This was largely in an attempt to reclaim and reconstruct the Algerian identity which was lost during French colonial rule.

The rise in Arabic speakers and education institutions was accompanied by the decline in the Berber speakers. Linguistic ability was a large factor in Berber identification meaning its decline was a threat to the survival of the Berber identity. The Berber narrative stated that the rapid Arab-Islamic conquest was rising at the expense of the Berber identity. The Berber struggle was seen as an uphill battle. Furthermore, these Arabization measures stigmatized the Berber speakers vis-à-vis the Arabic speakers through the creation of more rigid divides between the communities. Political and social power was seen to lie with the Arabs who imposed their will on the Berber minority.

Outburst of 1980s: the Berber question, the Berber Spring, the rise of political parties 
The Berber Question was revived during this period. The youth of Kabyle fought for the assertion of their Berber culture in a post-independent Arabist-Islamist Algeria. Repression of Berber particularism combined with the accelerating programs of Arabization in schools and universities led to the sharpening of the divide and the eventual outbreak of the 1980 Berber Spring. The catalyst was set on the 10th of March 1980, when the government banned a lecture given by Mouloud Mammeri on Ancient Berber poetry at the University of Tizi Ouzou. Strikes continued until the 26th of June. The Berber demonstrations in Algeria of that year were the first instance in the international scene where a Berber group demanded recognition on the institutional level of their culture, language, and place in society. The later 1980s saw a rise in Berber associations, political parties and cultural movements. Article 56 of the 1976 constitution stated that preliminary certification was needed in order to establish associations, over which the administration had discretionary power. Legally, this meant that no Berber associations could exist from 1962 until this was amended out of the constitution in 1988. Underground Berber groups could now officially register themselves, and by July 1989 there were officially 154 of these organizations. Of the most notable included the Berber Cultural Movement (MCB) which held its first official meeting in July 1989 in Tizi Ouzo. The MCB comprised French intellectuals and Kabliyan students with the agenda to oppose Arabization, call for recognition of Amazigh culture and language, and implement a Western style democracy. The MCB mobilized large groups of people and coordinated multiple protests to advance Berber culture, language, and position in civil society. However, the MCB had major limits on the account that the MCB was unable to resist the partisan tensions between the FFS and the RCD.

Events of 1990s

Creation of the High Commission for Amazighity (HCA) in 1995 
The creation of the HCA is regarded as the first step by the government to recognize the language of the Berber population, Tamazight. The commission would be attached to the office of the President and the commissioner would be appointed by the President to oversee the initiatives undertaken to advance and institutionalize the Berber language. The HCA was officially created by a decree on 8 May 1995, meaning it was in a fragile state due to its revocability. The government refused to acknowledge Tamazight as a national language alongside Arabic, while this decree was meant "to rehabilitate one of the components of the national culture and identity of all Algerians. It [was] in no way a recognition of linguistic or cultural rights of a particular area or minority".

Constitutional reform of 1996 
Changes in the constitution reflected this recognition and advancement of Berber language. The 1989 constitution made no mention of Berberism and declared in its second and third articles that "Islam is the religion of the state" and "Arabic is the national and official language". Whereas these two amendments were carried forward to the 1996 constitution, there was also the addition of a preamble which stated that "the fundamental components of its [Algeria's] identity are Islam, "Arabness", and Amazighness. Later in the preamble, was the mention that "Algeria is the land of Islam, an integral part of the Greater Maghreb, an Arab, Mediterranean and African country," subsequently contradicting the weight of the former advancement. Nonetheless, it was among the first steps towards recognition taken by the government.

1998 protests 
Berber communities broke out in mass protest against the law which declared Arabic as the only legitimate language in Algeria. This law was originally declared in 1991 and meant to go into effect on 5 July 1998. Throughout the years Kabyle culturists had continued to oppose the implantation of this law, mobilizing again for this cause. The last Berber mobilization of this size had been the Berber springs. Tension had been built up throughout the years by this law, however the catalyst which fueled this outbreak was the assassination of Lounes Matoub on 25 June 1998, an Algerian Berber singer and activist, by the Group Islamique Armee (GIA). Matoub had just arrived from France and was on track to release his 4th CD criticizing post-independence regime and asserting the Amazigh identity. On June 28, his funeral was held and 100,000 Berbers came together to protest, which resulted in the continuation of week-long outbursts of violence targeted at government property. Banners titled "no peace without the Berber language," "we are not Arabs," and "pouvoir assassin, [President Liamine] Zeroual assassin" could be seen throughout the protests.

Azawad and Mali

Tuareg people in Mali rebelled several times during the 20th century before finally forcing the Malian armed forces to withdraw below the line demarcating Azawad from southern Mali during the 2012 rebellion. On 6 April 2012, the National Movement for the Liberation of Azawad issued a declaration of independence for the territory it claims as a homeland for the Tuareg, a Berber people, citing what it alleged to be discrimination against the indigenous peoples of the Azawad by the government of Mali.

Morocco

The Amazigh Cultural Movement (MCA) (Tamazight: Amussu Adelsan Amaziɣ) is a berberist civil society movement based on the universal values of human rights. Today, there are more than 800 Amazigh associations throughout Morocco within the MCA.

1967 witnessed the creation of AMREC (the Moroccan association for research and cultural exchange) an Amazigh cultural organization which rose to prominence under berberist activists such as Brahim Akhiat, Abdellah Bounfour, Ahmed Akouaou, Omar El Khalfaoui and Ali El Jaoui.

The Amazigh Political Action Front (Front de l'Action Politique Amazighe or FAPA) is a Berberist political movement with ties to two political parties that are members of the government majority, the Rassemblement National des Indépendants (RNI) and the Mouvement Populaire (MP).

Tamaynut is an Amazigh berberist movement created in 1978, it has participated in the constitution of a modern and democratic civil society in Morocco. Its purpose is to defend and promote the inherent rights of the Amazighs, in order to develop a strong citizenship in a democratic, federal and united Morocco within its pluralism. Tamaynut's mission is to contribute to the defense and promotion of the rights of the Amazigh people.

The Amazigh Moroccan Democratic Party was founded in 2005 in Rabat by Omar Louzi, a long-time Berberist activist, former member of the (Berber-based) Popular Movement and cofounder of the Amazigh World Congress,The party was  banned by the Moroccan Interior Ministry on 25 November 2007 because its name infringes on the Moroccan law on political parties, which forbids parties explicitly based on ethnicity or religion. It then tried to be legally reestablished under a new denomination (Izegzawen) to promote Berber identity, political secularism, and Berber cultural rights.

Historical construction of ethnic divides 

The Berber dahir is a dhahir (decree) created by the French protectorate in Morocco on 16 May 1930. This dhahir changed the legal system in parts of Morocco where Amazigh languages were primarily spoken, while the legal system in the rest of the country remained the way it had been before the French invasion.

The new legal system in Amazigh communities would ostensibly be based on local Amazigh laws and customs rather than the authority of the sultan.

The Berber Dahir reinforced a dichotomy in popular Moroccan historiography: the division of the country into Bled el-Makhzen—areas under the direct control of the Sultan and the Makhzen, or the state, (especially urban areas such as Fes and Rabat)—and Bled es-Siba—typically geographically isolated areas beyond the direct control of the state, where Amazigh languages are primarily spoken and where Islamic Sharia was not applied. However, this legislation explicitly characterized the former as "Arab" and the latter as "Berber."

Achievements of the berberist movement

The Amazigh gilding in Morocco shone after the speech given by the monarch Mohamed VI in October 2001, in Ajdir, Khenifra region. His words deflated the outburst of the Amazigh activists and intellectuals who, a year ago, had presented to the Palace a document referred to as the Amazigh Manifesto, which demanded the national and legal recognition of the Amazigh identity.

On 17 October 2001, in the presence of his advisors, the members of the government, the leaders of the political parties and unions, and Amazigh activists, King Mohammed VI announced the royal decree (dahir) that established the Royal Institute of Amazigh Culture (L'Institut Royal de la Culture Amazighe, IRCAM). He defined Moroccan national identity as a composition of different cultural elements while acknowledging berbers as an ethnic majority, underlined that the Amazigh language constituted a principal element of the national culture, and added that its promotion was a national responsibility. The Royal Institute was charged with the promotion of Amazigh culture in education and media. While redefining Moroccan identity so as to incorporate Berberness.

The establishment of IRCAM represented the first substantial change in the state's attitude towards its large Berber-speaking population from a policy of subtle neglect to explicit recognition and support.

Canary Islands

Beginning with Antonio Cubillo's MPAIAC in the early 1970s, some Canarian nationalist organizations have supported Berberism in order to emphasize native Guanche cultural difference with Spanish culture and highlight 
Spanish colonialism.
Although the movements attracted sympathies among local Canarios, the violent terror actions used initially by Cubillo's movement brought about a general rejection. Thus, even after Cubillo publicly renounced the armed struggle in August 1979, he failed to inspire much popular support.

Currently some political organizations in the Canary Islands such as the National Congress of the Canaries (CNC), the Popular Front of the Canary Islands (FREPIC-AWAÑAK), Alternativa Popular Canaria,  Canarian Nationalist Party (PNC), Nueva Canarias (NC), Alternativa Popular Canaria (APC), Alternativa Nacionalista Canaria (ANC), Unidad del Pueblo (UP), Inekaren and Azarug espouse the pro-Berber cause in a higher or lower degree. Some of the symbols and colors of the flags of the Canarian pro-independence organizations, as well as the use of the word 'Taknara' (rejected by Cubillo himself) to refer to the archipelago, are seeking to represent Berber cultural roots.

See also

 Algerianism
 Anti-Arabism
 Arab-Berber
 Arabized Berber
 Barbary Coast
 Berber Jews
 Berber Revolt
 Berbers and Islam
 Ethnic nationalism
 Kabyle nationalism
 Lucien-Samir Oulahbib
 Moors
 Muslim conquest of the Maghreb
 Tamazgha

References

 
Politics of Algeria
Identity politics
Ethnicity in politics